Australian Institute of Sport are a former Australian netball team based in Canberra, Australian Capital Territory. They were the netball team of the Australian Institute of Sport. They effectively acted as a development/under-21 team for the Australia national netball team. Between 1985 and 1996, AIS played in the Esso/Mobil Superleague. In 1985 and 1986 they finished as champions. Between 2003 and 2007, the AIS and Netball ACT entered a combined team known as AIS Canberra Darters in the Commonwealth Bank Trophy. Between 2008 and 2012, the AIS entered a separate team in the Australian Netball League. They were ANL grand finalists in both 2008 and 2009. They have also entered teams in the NSW State League, Victorian State League and the South Australia State League.

History

Esso/Mobil Superleague
When the Australian Institute of Sport was established in 1981, netball was one of the eight original sports chosen to be part of the development program. Former Australia national netball team coach Wilma Shakespear was appointed the program's first head coach.

Between 1985 and 1996, AIS played in the Esso/Mobil Superleague. The league was formed as a partnership between the All Australia Netball Association and the AIS in order to provide the AIS team with more competitive matches. With a team coached by Shakespear and featuring Shelley Oates-Wilding and Vicki Wilson, AIS subsequently won the first two titles in 1985 and 1986. AIS also played in the 1987 and 1989 finals, losing to Melbourne Blues and Sydney Tigers respectively. Other AIS players from this era included Natalie Avellino, Sharon Finnan and Shelley O'Donnell. In 1990 Gaye Teede succeeded Shakespear as the program's head coach. Teede had served as assistant coach at the AIS since 1982. She remained as head coach until 1998.

Esso/Mobil Superleague placings

Commonwealth Bank Trophy

AIS Canberra Darters was originally formed as a partnership between the Australian Institute of Sport Netball Program and Netball ACT. They subsequently entered a combined team in the Commonwealth Bank Trophy. They joined the competition in 2003, replacing Adelaide Ravens. They continued to play in this competition until its demise in 2007. Their best performance came in 2004 when they finished 5th.

Regular season stats

Australian Netball League
The AIS and Netball ACT subsequently entered separate teams in the Australian Netball League with the Netball ACT team continuing to use the Canberra Darters name. The AIS  played in the ANL between 2008 and 2012. In 2008 and 2009, Simone McKinnis guided AIS squads featuring Shae Bolton, Ashleigh Brazill, Shannon Eagland Jasmine Keene, Sharni Layton, Samantha May, April Letton, Chelsea Pitman, Kara Richards, Jacqui Russell, Laura Scherian, Amy Steel and Courtney Tairi to two successive grand finals. However on each occasion they lost to Victorian Fury.

Regular season stats

State leagues
As well as entering teams in national leagues, AIS also entered teams in state leagues. During the 1980s and 1990s they regularly played in the New South Wales state netball league In 1997 they also began entering a team in the Dairy Farmers Victorian State League. In 2001, with a squad coached by Norma Plummer and featuring Jane Altschwager, Kristy Doyle, Susan Pratley, Kimberley Purcell, Rebecca Bulley and Natalie von Bertouch, an AIS team won the South Australia Farmers Union League title. Bertouch was also named the league's best and fairest player and was selected in the Team of the Year.

Grand finals

National leagues
Esso Gold Club Championship

Australian Club Championships

Esso Super League

Australian Netball League

State leagues

Tours
The  program also organised an annual international tour.

Notable former players

Internationals

 Chelsea Pitman
 Abby Sargent 
 Kate Shimmin

 Courtney Tairi

Coaches

Head coaches

Assistant coaches

Premierships
Esso Super League
Winners: 1985, 1986: 2
Runners up: 1987, 1989 : 2
Australian Netball League
Runners up: 2008, 2009: 2
South Australia State League
Winners: 2001
Runners up: 2000

References

 
netball
Defunct netball teams in Australia
Defunct sporting clubs in Canberra
Esso/Mobil Superleague teams
South Australia state netball league teams
Australian Netball League teams
Netball in the Australian Capital Territory
Netball teams in New South Wales
Netball teams in South Australia
Netball teams in Victoria (Australia)
1981 establishments in Australia
Sports clubs established in 1981
2013 disestablishments in Australia
Sports clubs disestablished in 2013